Niagara Park is a suburb of the Central Coast region of New South Wales, Australia  north of Gosford's central business district. It is part of the  local government area. It consists of residential housing as well as acreage blocks and small farms with many houses backing onto natural bushland and reserves. It is close to the M1 and is 20 minutes from Shelly Beach. A peaceful community with rural aspects and a large technology driven primary school, Niagara Park is ideal for families with young children.

The suburb contains Niagara Park railway station, which is on the Main North railway line. A shopping centre, timber mill, primary school, and sports centre are also located within Niagara Park.

Events

On the second Saturday of every month a large market is held at the shopping centre where residents set up tables selling various goods. There are also competitions for children held by the town crier.

A jobs convention is held annually at the local youth centre for  students from various schools. The event is aimed at years 11 and 12.

Every year there is a large fete held at the local Niagara Park Primary School which features many rides and in the hall there are many baked goods stores.

The small shopping centre has a Spar supermarket and takeaway, cupcake shop, and community centre. It also boasts two factory outlets: the Sara Lee factory outlet and Scholastic Books, as well as the Bottle-O Valley Tavern.

Notable residents
 Julie Goodwin, chef, won the first Australian Masterchef

References

Suburbs of the Central Coast (New South Wales)
Australian places named after U.S. places or U.S. history